Peter W. Bryant (born October 18, 1853 - July 30, 1912) was a lawyer and judge in Tampa, Florida. He was African American.

Bryant graduated fron Howard University. He served as a justice of the peace in Hillsborough County from 1877 until 1881. Bryant was one of many African American public officials and elected representatives in Tampa and Florida during that era. Henry Brumick, also African American, served on Tampa's city council from 1876 until 1877.

See also
Zacariah D. Greene

References

1853 births
1912 deaths